The Cobham Range trends in a northwest–southeast direction for about , standing west of Prince Philip Glacier in the southern part of the Churchill Mountains. It was mapped by the northern party of the New Zealand Geological Survey Antarctic Expedition, 1961–62, and named by the New Zealand Antarctic Place-Names Committee for a former Governor-General of New Zealand, Lord Cobham.

Features
Geographical features include:

 Chappell Nunataks
 Frustration Ridge
 Gargoyle Ridge
 Gray Glacier
 Lyttelton Peak
 Mount Kopere
 Olson Névé
 Schroeder Peak
 Tarakanov Ridge

References 

Mountain ranges of Oates Land
Transantarctic Mountains